Wilgus is an unincorporated community in Indiana County, in the U.S. state of Pennsylvania.

History
The community was named after one Mr. Wilgus, a businessperson in the local coal-mining industry.

References

Unincorporated communities in Pennsylvania
Unincorporated communities in Indiana County, Pennsylvania